Gosauseen are three lakes in the south-western, Alpine part of Upper Austria. They are situated near the town of Gosau, which is close to Salzburg. The mountains that encircle the lakes are called the Dachstein Mountains, whose glaciers partially shaped the landforms and still influence the hydrology of the area.

Vorderer Gosausee 

This is the biggest of the three lakes. It has an aerial tramway at its more accessible end.

Gosaulacke 

This water is the middle of three lakes, where the other two are called the outer and the inner Gosausee. The word See means lake, while the word Lacke (puddle) means a shallow water body with considerable changes of surface level (intermittent lake), even sometimes falling dry, as it can be observed for example with a salt lake. In the case of Gosaulacke, rain and water from thawing snow feed the lake. Its main inflow comes from the medium-sized inner lake and the main outflow feeds the much larger outer lake.

Hinterer Gosausee 

This is the most remote and middle sized lake in the series.

Lakes of Upper Austria